Cingula is a genus of minute sea snails, marine gastropod mollusks or micromollusks in the family Rissoidae.

Species
Species within the genus Cingula include:
 Cingula aequa (E. A. Smith, 1890)
 Cingula agapeta (E. A. Smith, 1890)
 Cingula alvearium (Watson, 1886)
 Cingula arenaria Mighels and C. B. Adams, 1842
 Cingula atomaria A. A. Gould, 1861
 Cingula carinata Mighels and C. B. Adams, 1842
 Cingula communis O. Boettger, 1906 †
 Cingula compsa (E. A. Smith, 1890)
 Cingula conoidea Thiele, 1930
 Cingula conspecta (E. A. Smith, 1904)
 Cingula dautzenbergi Glibert, 1949 †
 Cingula dharma (Yokoyama, 1926) †
 Cingula farquhari (E. A. Smith, 1910)
 Cingula fernandinae (Dall, 1927)
 Cingula helenae (Ponder, 1985)
 Cingula inconspicua C. B. Adams, 1852
 Cingula koeneni Glibert, 1952 †
 Cingula ligeriana Peyrot, 1938 †
 Cingula madreporica Issel, 1869
 Cingula miocenica Peyrot, 1938 †
 Cingula montereyensis Bartsch, 1912
 Cingula nitidula Thiele, 1930
 Cingula obtusispira Seguenza, 1879 †
 Cingula outis (Tomlin, 1931)
 Cingula paradoxa Thiele, 1930
 Cingula parryensis Ladd, 1966 †
 Cingula paulmyensis Peyrot, 1938 †
 Cingula pentodonta (Kendall & Bell, 1886) †
 Cingula perfecta (E. A. Smith, 1890)
 Cingula psammatica Issel, 1869
 Cingula pupina Cossmann, 1918
 Cingula regiorivi A. W. Janssen, 1967 †
 Cingula scipio Dall, 1887
 Cingula simulans (E. A. Smith, 1890)
 Cingula sternbergensis R. Janssen, 1978 †
 Cingula stewardsoni (Vanatta, 1909)
 Cingula trifasciata (J. Adams, 1800)
 Cingula turonensis Peyrot, 1938 †
 Cingula turoniensis Glibert, 1949 †
 Cingula vaga (E. A. Smith, 1890)
 Cingula varicifera (E. A. Smith, 1890)
 Cingula vera Cossmann & Peyrot, 1919 †
 Cingula villae Issel, 1869
 Cingula waabitica Issel, 1869
 Cingula wallichi (E. A. Smith, 1890)
 Cingula whitechurchi (Turton, 1932)
 Cingula winslowae (Bartsch, 1928)

Synonymized species 
 Cingula alaskana Bartsch, 1912: synonym of Onoba mighelsi (Stimpson, 1851)
 Cingula alderi (Jeffreys, 1858): synonym of  Obtusella intersecta (Wood S., 1857)
 Cingula aleutica Dall, 1887: synonym of Falsicingula aleutica (Dall, 1887)
 Cingula anselmoi van Aartsen & Engl, 1999: synonym of Setia anselmoi (van Aartsen & Engl, 1999)
 Cingula antipolitana van der Linden & W.M. Wagner, 1987: synonym of Setia antipolitana (van der Linden & Wagner, 1987)
 Cingula apicina Verrill, 1884: synonym of  Epitonium frielei (Dall, 1889)
 Cingula arenaria auct. non Maton & Rackett, 1807: synonym of Onoba mighelsii (Stimpson, 1851)
 Cingula beniamina Monterosato, 1844: synonym of  Crisilla beniamina (Monterosato, 1884)
 Cingula castanea (Möller, 1842): synonym of Boreocingula castanea (Møller, 1842)
 Cingula cingillus (Montagu, 1803): synonym of Cingula trifasciata (J. Adams, 1800)
 Cingula eyerdami Willett, 1934: synonym of Onoba carpenteri (Weinkauff, 1885)
 Cingula forresterensis Willett, 1934: synonym of Onoba forresterensis (Willett, 1934)
 Cingula globulus: synonym of  Boreocingula globulus (Moller, 1842)
 Cingula griegi (Friele, 1879): synonym of Pusillina tumidula (G. O. Sars, 1878)
 Cingula jacksoni (Bartsch, 1953): synonym of  Onobops jacksoni (Bartsch, 1953)
 Cingula katherinae Bartsch, 1911: synonym of Boreocingula martyni (Dall, 1886)
 Cingula moerchi Collin, 1887: synonym of Alvania moerchi (Collin, 1886)
 Cingula nitida: synonym of  Peringiella elegans (Locard, 1892)
 Cingula parva (da Costa, 1778): synonym of Rissoa parva (da Costa, 1778)
 Cingula proxima: synonym of  Ceratia proxima (Forbes & Hanley, 1850)
 Cingula semicostata (Montagu, 1803): synonym of  Onoba semicostata (Montagu, 1803)
 Cingula semistriata Montagu: synonym of Crisilla semistriata (Montagu, 1808)
 Cingula striata Montagu: synonym of Onoba semicostata (Montagu, 1803)
 Cingula sulcata O. Boettger, 1893: synonym of Liroceratia sulcata (Boettger, 1893)
 Cingula vitrea: synonym of Hyala vitrea (Montagu, 1803)

References

 Vaught, K.C. (1989). A classification of the living Mollusca. American Malacologists: Melbourne, FL (USA). . XII, 195 pp
 Gofas, S.; Le Renard, J.; Bouchet, P. (2001). Mollusca, in: Costello, M.J. et al. (Ed.) (2001). European register of marine species: a check-list of the marine species in Europe and a bibliography of guides to their identification. Collection Patrimoines Naturels, 50: pp. 180–213

External links
 Ponder W. F. (1985). A review of the Genera of the Rissoidae (Mollusca: Mesogastropoda: Rissoacea). Records of the Australian Museum supplement 4: 1-221

Rissoidae